The Tony Danza Show is a daytime variety talk show that premiered on September 13, 2004, in syndication and was distributed by Buena Vista Television. For its entire two-season run the show aired live in the Eastern Time Zone at 10 AM for markets that chose to carry it at that time (not all did); the show aired immediately after Live with Regis and Kelly, also aired live from the same studio complex and distributed by Buena Vista. The Tony Danza Show was recorded at the ABC studio complex on Manhattan's Upper West Side.

The program was hosted by actor and New York native Tony Danza. For the first season Danza was joined by Ereka Vetrini as his co-host, with music provided by pianist Nadia DiGiallonardo. After the first season, Vetrini, who gained fame appearing on The Apprentice, was let go from the program, and DiGiallonardo took over most of her co-hosting duties.

On May 9, 2005, during a go-kart race with NASCAR Hall of Famer Rusty Wallace (who was a guest that day), Danza's kart flipped after Wallace accidentally bumped him. Danza suffered a concussion; neither he nor Wallace were wearing a helmet.

The most-viewed episode of the series featured the heavy metal band, The Tony Danza Tapdance Extravaganza, and their appearance followed an email from a viewer. The ratings, however, were not strong and in early March 2006, Danza told viewers that he was not sure if the program would return after a scheduled two-week hiatus. On March 24, 2006, the program returned with new episodes but after two more months The Tony Danza Show came to an end. The last live broadcast aired on May 26, 2006, with reruns continuing until September 15, 2006. VH1's The Best Week Ever then started an online petition to save the show.

Extravadanza
"Extravadanza" was a game played once each day with a home viewer via telephone. Danza (or, more often, his co-host) would drop a chip on a Plinko-style board. Unlike Plinko, a stuck chip still counted when it eventually hit an amount. The caller would then try to answer a question, and similar to the games on Live with Regis and Kelly had 10 seconds and only one guess (as opposed to 20 seconds on "Live"). A correct answer won the dollar amount the chip landed on.

References

External links
 

First-run syndicated television programs in the United States
2000s American television talk shows
2004 American television series debuts
2006 American television series endings
English-language television shows
Television series by Disney–ABC Domestic Television
Television shows set in New York City